2000 Herschel, provisional designation , is a stony Phocaea asteroid and a tumbling slow rotator from the inner regions of the asteroid belt, approximately  in diameter. It was discovered 29 July 1960, by German astronomer Joachim Schubart at Sonneberg Observatory in eastern Germany. The S-type asteroid has a long rotation period of 130 hours. It was named after astronomer William Herschel.

Orbit and classification 

Herschel is a member of the Phocaea family, a large family of stony asteroids with nearly two thousand known members. It orbits the Sun in the inner main-belt at a distance of 1.7–3.1 AU once every 3 years and 8 months (1,341 days; semi-major axis of 2.38 AU). Its orbit has an eccentricity of 0.30 and an inclination of 23° with respect to the ecliptic.

The relatively high orbital eccentricity of this object causes it to come close to the orbit of the planet Mars. This means there is a chance it will eventually collide with the planet, with the odds of a collision estimated at 18% per billion orbits.

Naming 

This minor planet was named in honour of the English astronomer of German origin William Herschel (1738–1822), who discovered what he called Georgium Sidus (aka Uranus). The official  was published by the Minor Planet Center on 15 October 1977. While the minor planet with number "1000", 1000 Piazzia, honors the discoverer of the first minor planet, Giuseppe Piazzi, number "2000" does so for Herschel, discoverer of the first telescopic major planet. The asteroid is one of several early "kilo-numbered" minor planets that were dedicated to renowned scientists or institutions including:
 1000 Piazzia named for Giuseppe Piazzi, discoverer of Ceres
 2000 Herschel for William Herschel who discovered Uranus
 3000 Leonardo for the Italian polymath of the Renaissance, Leonardo da Vinci
 4000 Hipparchus for ancient Greek astronomer Hipparchus

Physical characteristics 

In the Tholen classification, Herschel is a common S-type asteroid.

Slow rotator and tumbler 

Analysis of the lightcurve for this object appears to show that it is tumbling, with rotation occurring about the non-principal axis. Lightcurve analysis gave a rotation period of  hours with a high brightness variation of  magnitude. This makes it a slow rotator.

Diameter and albedo 

The Collaborative Asteroid Lightcurve Link assumes a standard albedo for a stony asteroid of 0.20 and calculates a diameter of 16.71 kilometers based on an absolute magnitude of 11.25. According to the surveys carried out by the Japanese Akari satellite and the NEOWISE mission of NASA's Wide-field Infrared Survey Explorer, Herschel measures between 14.768 and 17.385 kilometers in diameter and its surface has an albedo between 0.1870 and 0.256.

See also 
 20000 Varuna

References

External links 
 Lightcurve plot of 2000 Herschel, Palmer Divide Observatory, B. D. Warner (2008)
 Asteroid Lightcurve Database (LCDB), query form (info )
 Dictionary of Minor Planet Names, Google books
 Discovery Circumstances: Numbered Minor Planets (1)-(5000) – Minor Planet Center
 
 

002000
Discoveries by Joachim Schubart
Named minor planets
002000
002000
19600729